Unzá-Apreguíndana (Basque: Untzaga-Apregindana) is a town council in Urkabustaiz municipality, Álava province, Basque Country, Spain. It comprises the villages of Unzá (Basque: Untzaga) and Apreguíndana (Basque: Apregindana). 

Towns in Álava